Gogo, Boulkiemdé is a town in the Poa Department of Boulkiemdé Province in central western Burkina Faso. It has a population of 2,969.

References

External links
Satellite map at Maplandia.com

Populated places in Boulkiemdé Province